is a railway station located in the city of Ōdate, Akita Prefecture, Japan, operated by the East Japan Railway Company (JR East).

Lines

Station layout
The station consists of one side platform serving a single bi-directional track. The station is unattended.

History
Jūnisho Station was opened on December 25, 1915 on the privately owned Akita Railways, serving the town of Jūnisho, Akita. The line was nationalized on June 1, 1934, becoming part of the Japanese Government Railways (JGR) system, which became the Japan National Railways (JNR) after World War II. The station was absorbed into the JR East network upon the privatization of the JNR on April 1, 1987.

Surrounding area

See also
 List of Railway Stations in Japan

External links

  JR East Station information 

Railway stations in Japan opened in 1915
Railway stations in Akita Prefecture
Stations of East Japan Railway Company
Ōdate
Hanawa Line